Eric Bernt has built most of his career as a writer for Hollywood box office films. He made his directorial debut in 2005 with the movie Vegas Baby. He has given lectures at universities on the topic of screenwriting.

Writer - Filmography
The Echo (2008) (written by)
Vegas Baby (2005) (written by)
Highlander: Endgame (2000) (story)
Romeo Must Die (2000) (screenplay)
Virtuosity (1995) (written by)
Surviving the Game (1994) (written by)

Director - Filmography
Vegas Baby (2005)
Bachelor Party Vegas (2006)

Actor - Filmography
Virtuosity (1995) - Building Supervisor

Future projects - Filmography
Infected (by Scott Sigler)

References

External links

American male screenwriters
Living people
Year of birth missing (living people)